This article lists manufacturers of bass amplifiers, loudspeakers, and other amplification-related items such as preamplifiers. The amplifiers and loudspeakers used to amplify bass instruments (e.g., the bass guitar, double bass and similar instruments) are distinct from other types of amplification systems due to the particular challenges associated with low-frequency sound reproduction. 

This distinction affects the design of the loudspeakers, the cabinet, and the preamplifier and amplifier. Loudspeakers for bass instruments tend to be larger and more heavy-duty, and speaker cabinets have to be built more solidly to prevent unwanted rattling due to the low frequencies. Preamplifiers and amplifiers for bass instruments often have features designed for bass instruments, such as equalizers that go down to 40 Hz or below or limiters to prevent speaker damage.

Types of manufacturers
Bass equipment manufacturers include a variety of different types of companies, ranging from companies that only make individual components to companies that only make bass amplifiers and loudspeakers (e.g., Gallien-Krueger). At the other end of the spectrum are companies that offer bass amplification equipment as part of a much broader offering of different types of instrument amplifiers and public address systems (e.g., Peavey, Carvin A&I or Yorkville Sound.)

Another way of categorizing bass equipment manufacturers is by which part of the market they are targeting. While Peavey and Yorkville products are aimed at the generalist mass market, some bass equipment manufacturers, such as Acoustic Image or Walter Woods make expensive "boutique" equipment that is aimed at a niche market within the professional musician market. Acoustic Image amplifiers and speaker cabinets tend to be used by professional acoustic folk and jazz musicians, and Walter Woods amplifiers are associated with professional acoustic jazz bass players.

List of manufacturers

 Acoustic Control Corporation
 Aguilar
 Ampeg
 Ashdown Engineering  
 Behringer
 Blackstar Amplification
 Carvin A&I
 Carver
 Crate Amplifiers
 Crown Audio
 Darkglass
 Demeter
 Eden Electronics   
 Fender  
 Gallien-Krueger 
 Hiwatt
 Kustom
 Laney Amplification   
 Marshall Amplification 
 Mesa/Boogie
 Orange Amplification
 Peavey Electronics  
 Roland Corporation
 Smith Custom Amplifiers
 SWR Sound Corporation   
 TC Electronic 
 Tech 21
 Teisco 
 Trace Elliot  
 Traynor (Yorkville Sound)
 Warwick
 Yamaha

Amplifiers and/or preamplifiers
 Alembic (preamps and filters)

See also
 Bass effects
 Bass instrument amplification

Amplification
Bass amplifier and loudspeaker manufacturers
Music equipment manufacturers

nl:Basversterker